Firefly Car Rental is a low cost American car rental brand owned by The Hertz Corporation. Hertz developed the new brand to replace Advantage Rent a Car which had to be sold following the acquisition of Dollar Thrifty Automotive Group.

It first opened in March 2013 with branches in Europe, with American branches following in September 2013. In August 2014 Firefly opened its first location in the Middle-East serving Dubai Airport in the UAE and in September 2014 opened its first locations in Australia. As of January 2015 it has over 100 locations in 13 countries.

References

External links
 Firefly Car Rental official site
 Firefly Car Rental (Europe) official site

American companies established in 2013
Car rental companies based in Florida
Retail companies established in 2013
Transport companies established in 2013
Companies that filed for Chapter 11 bankruptcy in 2020